Crispus Nzano (died 2008) was a Kenyan Anglican bishop in the second half of the twentieth century: he became Coadjutor Bishop of Mombasa in 1980; and was subsequently its Diocesan until his retirement in 1993.

Notes

20th-century Anglican bishops of the Anglican Church of Kenya
Anglican bishops of Mombasa
2008 deaths